A by-election was held for the Australian House of Representatives seat of Yarra on 18 February 1922. This was triggered by the death of Labor MP Frank Tudor, the Leader of the Opposition.

The by-election was won by Labor candidate and future Prime Minister James Scullin.

Results

References

1922 elections in Australia
Victorian federal by-elections
1920s in Melbourne